The 2020–21 Southern Miss Lady Eagles basketball team represents the University of Southern Mississippi during the 2020–21 NCAA Division I women's basketball season. The team is led by seventeenth-year head coach Joye Lee-McNelis, and plays their home games at the Reed Green Coliseum in Hattiesburg, Mississippi as a member of Conference USA.

Schedule and results

|-
!colspan=12 style=|Non-conference regular season

|-
!colspan=12 style=|CUSA regular season

|-
!colspan=12 style=| CUSA Tournament

See also
 2020–21 Southern Miss Golden Eagles basketball team

Notes

References

Southern Miss Lady Eagles basketball seasons
Southern Miss Lady Eagles
Southern Miss Lady Eagles basketball
Southern Miss Lady Eagles basketball